Andrew Donnelly (born 29 March 1973) is a former Australian rules footballer who played with the West Coast Eagles in the Australian Football League (AFL).

Although Donnelly, a half forward, was drafted by Sydney in the 1992 AFL Draft he remained at WAFL club Subiaco in 1993. He however made the move to Sydney in 1994 but only played in their reserves and returned to Subiaco in 1995. After winning Subiaco's 1995 "Best and Fairest" award, Donnelly was signed up West Coast through the pre-season draft.

Donnelly was a solid contributor to West Coast in their run to the second week of finals in 1996, playing 20 games. He had 118 marks, the second most by a West Coast player and kicked 28 goals, the third most. In just his third league game, against Melbourne, he kicked four goals and had 25 disposals to earn best on ground honours at the Brownlow Medal night. He was awarded the best first year player award for 1996 by the Eagles, beating Ben Cousins who also made his debut that year and won the 1996 AFL Rising Star award. He struggled with various injuries during the rest of his time with the Eagles and retired in 2001, after another season playing for Subiaco.

He is now the chief executive officer of insurance firm Australian Reliance, which is a partner of the West Coast Eagles.

References

1973 births
West Coast Eagles players
Subiaco Football Club players
Living people
Australian rules footballers from Western Australia
Western Australian State of Origin players